Ifenat is a town in the Batha Region of Chad.

Location
Latitude 13.6719
Longitude 18.6420

References
 https://www.google.ca/maps/place/Ifenat/@13.670424,18.6331558,16z/data=!3m1!4b1!4m2!3m1!1s0x113baf438d82f49d:0xb6a50281018022bc
 http://www.fallingrain.com/world/CD/01/Ifenat.html

Populated places in Chad
Batha Region